The Free European Song Contest 2021 was the second edition of the Free European Song Contest, organised by the German television network ProSieben and the production company Raab TV.

The show was broadcast on 15 May 2021 at 20:15 CEST on the television channel ProSieben and on the streaming platform Joyn. It was presented for the second consecutive time by Steven Gätjen and Conchita Wurst.

The winning song was "The One" by Rea Garvey, representing Ireland. It marked Ireland's first victory in the event. For the second consecutive year, the Netherlands finished as runner-up, this year represented by Danny Vera with his 2019 hit "Rollercoaster." Debutant Belgium finished in third place with Milow and his song "ASAP." Although he finished with the same number of points as fellow debuting country Scotland, tiebreak rules put the Belgian entry ahead.

Format

Presenters 
For the second consecutive time, the programme was hosted by two presenters: the German television host Steven Gätjen and the Austrian singer Conchita Wurst, who won the Eurovision Song Contest 2014.

Participants

Score sheet
All countries used a jury vote, except Austria, Germany, and Switzerland; whose results were determined via televote.

12 points

Spokespersons 
As in 2020, all spokespersons, save for those announcing the votes for the three televoting regions (Austria, Germany, and Switzerland), also served as their country's national juror.

  – Johnny Logan 
  – Eric Kabongo
  – Sylvie Meis
  – Ofenbach
  – Nathan Evans
  – Eko Fresh 
  – Lucas Cordalis
  – Lina Kuduzović 
  – Javi Martínez
  – Halina
  – Ross Antony
  – Pietro Lombardi
  – Monica Ivancan
  – Fabio Landert
  – Sasha
  – Christina Stürmer

Notes

See also 

 Eurovision Song Contest 2021

References 

2021 song contests
2021 in German television
2021 in Germany
2021 in music